Cobourg Collegiate Institute (CCI), formerly known as Cobourg District Collegiate Institute East (CDCI East), is a high school in the town of Cobourg, Ontario, Canada.

The school was created by the merger of two high schools, Cobourg District Collegiate East and Cobourg District Collegiate West.  Both school dates back to the then Cobourg High School which operated from 1901 to 1961.

References

External links

High schools in Ontario